Carla Jade Lynch (born 19 May 1984, Newcastle upon Tyne) is a British comedian and model who plays the "Scummy Mummy" in Channel 4's comedy show Balls of Steel. Lynch got her first break in television as a presenter on Channel 4's Whatever in 2006.

References 

 http://www.sundaysun.co.uk/whats-on-newcastle-north-east/celebrity-showbiz-news/2008/04/13/revealed-demure-carla-lynch-is-scummy-mummy-in-tv-s-balls-of-steel-79310-20756805/ Retrieved 14 May 2008

Living people
English women comedians
People from Newcastle upon Tyne
1984 births